The 2004 European Parliament election in Sweden was the election of MEP representing Sweden constituency for the 2004-2009 term of the European Parliament. It was part of the wider 2004 European election. The vote took place on 13 June. The ruling Social Democrats polled poorly, but virtually all the established parties lost ground to the eurosceptic June List.

Results

The Insight Party, Struggle of the Union Citizens, International Integration Party, Vision Europe Party, International Integration Party, Republicans right and all the various lists of Bosse Persson had only one candidate on their lists. The Communist League had 4 candidates, but only got 2 votes.

External links

Sweden
European Parliament elections in Sweden
2004 elections in Sweden